Brightspeed of Texas, Inc. is a telephone operating company owned by Brightspeed that provides local telephone service in Texas. The company serves communities in Texas such as Killeen, Copperas Cove, and Cranfills Gap.

History
Brightspeed of Texas was founded in 1956 as Central Telephone of Texas,a subsidiary of Centel. In 1992, Centel was acquired by Sprint, and Central of Texas began carrying business on under the Sprint name retained its corporate name.

In 2006, the company was spun off into Embarq when Sprint Nextel spun off its local telephone operations.

The company did business as CenturyLink from 2009-2022 following the acquisition of Embarq by CenturyTel.

Sale to Brightspeed
On August 3, 2021, Lumen announced its sale of its local telephone assets in 20 states to Apollo Global Management, including Texas.  Apollo announced the company acquiring the Lumen assets would trade under the name "Brightspeed".. The sale closed on October 3, 2022. Central of Texas was then renamed Brightspeed of Texas.

References

See also
Brightspeed
Centel
Embarq

Lumen Technologies
Sprint Corporation
Communications in Texas
Telecommunications companies of the United States
1956 establishments in Texas
Telecommunications companies established in 1956
American companies established in 1956